Independent Insurance was an insurer in the United Kingdom for personal lines, automotive and commercial insurance. It was worth £900m at its peak. It failed in 2001 and two of its executives were jailed.

References

Defunct insurance companies
Defunct companies of the United Kingdom
Insurance companies of the United Kingdom
Financial services companies disestablished in 2001